This is a list of players that participated in the men's wheelchair basketball competition at the 2020 Summer Paralympics.

Group A

Group B

References

men's team rosters
2021 in basketball
2020